"A Few Good Things Remain" is a song written by Jon Vezner and Pat Alger, and recorded by American country music artist Kathy Mattea.  It was released in November 1990 as the second single from her compilation album A Collection of Hits.  The song reached #9 on the Billboard Hot Country Singles & Tracks chart.

Chart performance

Year-end charts

References

1991 singles
Kathy Mattea songs
Songs written by Pat Alger
Song recordings produced by Allen Reynolds
Mercury Records singles
Songs written by Jon Vezner
1990 songs